Take Off Ultraleichtflug GmbH (English: Take Off Ultralight Aircraft Limited), often referred to as just Take Off GmbH, is a German aircraft manufacturer based in Hamm. The company specializes in the design and manufacture of ultralight aircraft in the form of ready-to-fly aircraft. It also builds aircraft engines, based upon BMW motorcycle engines.

The Minimum is a powered hang glider design that was introduced in 1979. This was followed by the Maximum, an ultralight trike, in 1989. The Merlin series of trikes was introduced in 1994.

The company also builds aircraft engines based upon BMW motorcycle engines, including the  TBM 11 and the  TBM 12.

The company also builds ground effect vehicles, airboats and propeller-driven snowmobiles.

Aircraft 
Summary of aircraft built by Take Off:
Take Off Minimum
Take Off Maximum
Take Off Merlin

References

External links

Aircraft manufacturers of Germany
Ultralight aircraft
Ultralight trikes